Anne M. Swap is a United States Navy rear admiral who has served as the Director of the National Capital Medical Directorate since July 2, 2020. Previously, she served as the Commander of Naval Medical Forces Atlantic from November 2016 to July 2020.

References

External links
 

Year of birth missing (living people)
Living people
Place of birth missing (living people)
United States Navy admirals